Railway stations in Togo include:

Maps 

 UNHCR Map - includes yet to be built railways
 UN Map GH - covers 95% of Togo
 UNHCR Map of Benin - covers 95& of Togo
 UNECA Map

Towns served by rail 
All lines  gauge. Overview

Existing 
Although the following destinations are listed as 'existing', none of them has been served by trains for many years.
  Lomé - port, junction  and national capital 
  Atakpamé - N
  Notsé - N
  Tsévié - N
  Ana - N
  Akaba - N
  Blitta - N - terminus
  Cinkassé - proposed extension in 2018 to Dry Port

 Sotouboua - N - extended terminus

  Lomé - port, junction  and national capital 
  - Junction to Diamond Cement in Aflao, Ghana
  Kpalimé - W - branch terminus

  Lomé - port, junction  and national capital 
  - Junction to Diamond Cement in Aflao, Ghana
   - border between Togo and Ghana
  Aflao - Diamond Cement Ghana Limited factory at Aflao to the Lomé Port completed in March 2014.

 Lomé - port, junction
 Aného - E - branch terminus

Proposed 

 Morita
 Tchanaga

 Tabligbo - clinker - CIMAO cement  (2001)

 Benin and Niger * ( gauge)

2018 
Proposals Lomé to Cinkassé

Treaty 

A treaty of the 1960s expected certain railway lines to be closed on completion of road improvements.

See also 

  Transport in Togo
  Rail transport in Togo
  AfricaRail
  Railway stations in Benin

References 

 
Railway stations
Railway stations